Nodi Swamy Ivanu Irode Heege is a 2022 Indian Kannada-language comedy drama film directed by Islahuddin NS and starring Rishi, Dhanya Balakrishna and Apoorva Bharadwaj. The film released on Zee5. The film is about a man with depression and is suicidal.

Cast 
Rishi as Sai Kumar
Dhanya Balakrishna as Gajalakshmi
Nagabhushana
Aproova Bharadwaj as Vinutha 
Greeshma Sridhar

Proudction  
After Sarvajanikarige Suvarnavakasha (2019), Rishi and Dhanya star together in this film.

Reception 
A critic from The Times of India wrote that "To chose a subject that deals with depression and suicide as the central theme and converting that into a comedy is tough. One must applaud the writing for making this believable". A critic from The New Indian Express opined that "Unfortunately, NSIIH, a film that highlights the issue of depression with limited doses of humour, is neither relatable nor is it funny". A critic from Deccan Herald said that "While there is a sincere attempt to address the immediate issue of depression, especially with the increased numbers during and post pandemic lockdown, the movie does take a set back in terms of relaxed storytelling and a hurried closure".

References 

2020s Kannada-language films
2022 comedy-drama films
2020s Indian films
2022 films